TPH Club as known as Tú Puedes Hacerlo was a Spanish children's program aired on Televisión Española between 13 September 1999 and September 2004 and hosted by Paloma Lago. The program was created by Antoni D'Ocon, the creator of Sylvan, Delfy and His Friends and Scruff.

Plot 
This program is addressed to children aged between 4 and 11. It's also hosted by Paloma Lago. Her friends are four computer games' characters: 6UR4 - a female kangaroo from Australia, Supereñe - a funny superhero, M4R1A - a dizzy blond tennis player, and M4X - the boy from the future. Their leader PCTPH is a talking and flying monitor.

Characters 
 Paloma is a young hostess of the program. She shows the painting made by the fans and answers their questions.
 Gura (6UR4) is a smart female Australian kangaroo. She's the smartest team member. Her hobby is traveling. She is voiced by Mar Roca.
 Supereñe is a very funny and kind male Superhero. He's the youngest team member. His hobby is the letter Ñ, flying and encyclopedia. He is voiced by Rafael Turia.
 Maria (M4R1A) is a female tennis player and Max's girlfriend. She's the bravest team member. Her hobby is music and sport. She is voiced by Marta Covas.
 Max (M4X) is a teenager from the future and Maria's boyfriend. He's an oldest team member. His hobby is PC and console games. He has an awful twin-brother – Commander Peligro. He is voiced by Carles Di Blasi.
 PCTPH is a flying and talking monitor. He is a four characters leader.
 Commander Peligro is Max's evil twin-brother and the main antagonist. Gura, Supereñe and Maria despise him.

Intro 
Intro is a sequence which opens the TV block. First, Gura appears on the background with some presents. Next, Supereñe is seen on the light blue background. Later, other animated characters are seen with two first characters walking from right to left. Later on the graphical background appears Maria which rounds around. Soon the all animated stars with three protagonists appear on the blue background. At the end the TPH Club logo appears on the white background.

Logo 
The TPH Club logo appears everywhere. This logo is two colored squares. First square is blue with green triangle and black V shape with T (on upper left), P (on upper right) and H (on bottom middle). Second square is red with yellow round and black half-moon shape with C. Under the squares there are the words: "TPH" in blue and "CLUB" in red.

Credits 
Created by: Antoni D'Ocon
Directed by: Anna Ribas
Written by:
 Joseph Viciana
 Ramón Herrero
Hosted by: Paloma Lago
With the voices of:
 Mar Roca
 Marta Covas
 Rafael Turia
 Carles Di Blasi
Music by:
 Theo Paul Jaskolowskí
 Guy Wenger
Theme song lyrics by: Laura Cerdan
Theme song performance: Leticia Sabater
Produced by:
 D'Ocon Films Productions
 Televisión Española

Series aired on the block 
 Adventures from the Book of Virtues
 Alfred J Kwak
 Around the World with Willy Fog
 Arthur
 Bugs Bunny Show
 Delfy and His Friends
 Digimon Adventure
 Dogtanian and the Three Muskehounds
 Doraemon
 Fix and Foxi
 Inspector Gadget
 Mr Bogus
 Mort and Phil
 Oggy and the Cockroaches
 Patrol 03
 Peanuts
 Rugrats
 Scruff
 Sesame Street
 Sharky & George
 Space Goofs
 Sylvan
 The Country Mouse and the City Mouse Adventures
 The Fruitties
 The Mozart Band
 The Neverending Story
 Tiny Toon Adventures
 The Triplets
 The World of David the Gnome

External links 
 The TPH Club's Official Site
 Canal Supereñe's Official Site
 Canal Supereñe's Official YouTube Channel

Spanish children's television series
1999 Spanish television series debuts
2003 Spanish television series endings
RTVE shows